Nowgam is a major village located in the Shangus tehsil in Anantnag district of the Indian union territory of Jammu and Kashmir. It is located 11 km east of Anantnag and 74 km south of the Srinagar, the state capital.

The village is known for its commercial and educational activities.The Shahi Hamdan cricket ground located at the higher altitude is the centre of attraction.The village is home to many rituals notably an ancient ritual of bathing in a local spring located in Ogjibalan,which can heal itching and rashes in the body.The village has given birth to many intellectuals,cricketers,politicians and administrators.Many picnic spots find their way through Nowgam.

Demographics
The main language spoken in the village is Kashmiri, though Urdu and Hindi are also widely understood. The population of Nowgam is more than 5682 consisting of about 51.37% males and 48.63% females. Agriculture is the main occupation of the people living there. It is situated along the foothills of the north western Himalaya Mountains and is located close to the  Khundroo Camp, which is among the largest military ammunition depots in North India. The literacy rate of the village is around above 85%, though there is a huge gender disparity between males and females. The etymology the village's name originates with the nine springs (or nine adjacent villages). The village is dominated by Kashmiri Muslims, though small communities of Hindus and Sikhs are also found in the village.

See also 
Anantnag
Achabal
Shangus

References

Villages in Anantnag district